Alan Douglas McDonald is a parish minister and was Moderator of the General Assembly of the Church of Scotland, from the Assembly of May 2006 until May 2007.

McDonald was born in Glasgow and trained initially as a lawyer (gaining an LLB from the University of Strathclyde). He studied for the ministry at New College, Edinburgh (BD, MTh). He served as assistant minister in Greenside Parish Church, Edinburgh, and was subsequently a community minister in West Pilton, Edinburgh. He served for 15 years in Holburn Central Church, Aberdeen, before being called, in 1998, to the Fife parishes of Cameron and St Leonards (St Andrews).

He was convener of the General Assembly's Church and Nation committee for four years until May 2004. He is married and has two children. His formal title (following the end of his Moderatorial year) is the Very Reverend Dr Alan McDonald.

See also
List of Moderators of the General Assembly of the Church of Scotland

External links
St Leonard's Parish Church website
Church of Scotland

References

Year of birth missing (living people)
Living people
Clergy from Glasgow
Moderators of the General Assembly of the Church of Scotland
Alumni of the University of Strathclyde
Alumni of the University of Edinburgh